Balazs Marton Sziranyi Somogyi (born 1983 in Budapest in Hungary) is a Spanish water polo player. At the 2012 Summer Olympics, he competed for the Spain men's national water polo team in the men's event. He is 6 ft 5 inches tall.

References

Spanish male water polo players
1983 births
Living people
Olympic water polo players of Spain
Water polo players at the 2012 Summer Olympics
Sportspeople from Budapest